Choristella marshalli is a species of sea snail, a marine gastropod mollusk in the family Choristellidae.

Description

Distribution
This marine species is endemic to New Zealand.

References

Choristellidae
Gastropods described in 1992